Dragline is the debut studio album by the American grunge band Paw. It was released in 1993 through A&M Records. It sold around 80,000 copies.

The single "Jessie" released in 1993, reached number 82 in the UK. Other singles from the album included "Lolita" in 1992 and "Sleeping Bag" and "Couldn't Know" in 1993.

In 2015, the album was re-released by Cherry Red Records Ltd. with all the b-sides from the singles as bonus tracks as well as extensive liner notes and slightly different artwork (the band logo and the title are smaller).

Production
The album was recorded at Smart Studios, in Madison, Wisconsin.

Critical reception
The Morning Call wrote that "the approach is elemental and effective: a rhythm pounces, and a metallic guitar groove drills holes before surrendering to softly ringing accents or gently strummed acoustics as [Mark] Hennessy sings about death and suffering in a throaty roar." The Los Angeles Times deemed the album "country-grunge," writing: "It would take a major revolution to get country radio to play this--there’s way too much wattage in the amps. But there is also plenty of Middle American sensibility, giving this debut a character all its own." Trouser Press wrote that "much of the quartet’s sonic heft emanates from the formidable drum-pounding of Peter Fitch, whose brother Grant hammers out echo-drenched guitar riffs that revisit a limited number of arena-rock clichés with alarming frequency." The New York Times wrote that "Hennessy's conviction, and his ability to distill situations into terse, allusive lyrics, make him a rival of Pearl Jam's Eddie Vedder." The New Yorker called the album "equal parts metallic vigor and Southern-rock grit."

Rolling Stone listed Dragline at #35 on its list of the "50 Greatest Grunge Albums."

Track listing
All songs were written by Mark Hennessy and Grant Fitch, except where noted.

Personnel
Mark Hennessy - Vocals
Charles Bryan - Bass
Grant Fitch - Guitar
Peter Fitch - Drums

References

1993 debut albums
Paw (band) albums
A&M Records albums